One Central in Sé, Macau is a waterfront mixed-used project developed by Hongkong Land and Shun Tak Holdings and completed in 2009.

The  development comprises seven apartment residential towers centred around a 42-storey tower, housing the Mandarin Oriental, Macau  with 213 guestrooms, 111 serviced apartments, waterfront bar, restaurant, and spa.

Location 
One Central is centrally located on the Avendia de Sagres at NAPE (i.e.Novos Aterros do Porto Exterior), next to MGM Macau at the waterfront and facing Taipa. With Nam Van Lake to the west and the South China Sea to the south, the site is dominated by the presence of water, which heavily influences the design.

History 

In 2005, Hongkong Land and Shun Tak Holdings entered a joint venture to develop a  site on the reclaimed land overlooking Nam Van Lake.

The mixed use development was designed by international design firm Kohn Pedersen Fox (KPF) and completed in 2009.  One Central's Mandarin Oriental hotel and serviced apartments were completed in 2010.

One Central Macau Mall 
The One Central Macau retail complex comprises a  retail mall set across a three-level podium.  The mall is connected to MGM Grand Macau casino and the Mandarin Oriental, Macau, and close to Wynn Macau, Grand Lisboa, and Star World Macau.

One Central Macau is home to a wide selection of international designer brands. Many of these brands have either opened their first, their largest, or their flagship stores in Macau at One Central.

Design 
Kohn Pedersen Fox Associates PC (KPF) were the Design Architects of One Central, supported by Lead Architect Wong & Tung International Limited and Architect Eddie Wong & Associates Limited.  The award-winning development has been recognised for the following awards: Quality Building Award - Office (2014), Best Tall Building Asia & Australasia (CTBUH 2011), Certificate of Excellence (Perspective 2010).

During the day, the rippled façade reflects light to create a kaleidoscope effect, while at night the façade is accentuated by dynamic lighting by Brandston Partnership Incorporation.

Events 
Macau International Lantern Festival is an annual event that takes place on One Central Macau Promenade.  The festival, first held in 2016 and supported by Macao Government Tourism Office, features magnificent giant lantern installations created by artists from all over the world who jointly design the highly-creative series of glittering lanterns.

References

External links
One Central Mall
Development details

Buildings and structures in Macau
Landmarks in Macau
Sé, Macau